The Greenwood Braves were a single-A minor league baseball team located in Greenwood, South Carolina that existed from 1968 to 1979.

History

Affiliated with the Atlanta Braves, the Braves were members of the Western Carolinas League. The Braves captured League Championships in 1968, 1971 and 1978. Baseball Hall of Fame Inductee Hoyt Wilhelm managed the Braves in 1973. The team was disbanded after the 1979 season when the Western Carolinas League was reorganized into the South Atlantic League. However, the franchise was revived in 1981, when the Greenwood Pirates, also playing at Legion Park, entered the South Atlantic League.

The ballpark

They Braves played home games at Legion Park. Still in use today, the park is located at US 221 at Ginn Street in Greenwood. Legion Park used to be the home stadium of the local Division II Lander Bearcats before they moved to their new home in Dolny Stadium in 2012. Today the stadium is still used by the Lander University Club Baseball team for their home games.

Notable alumni

Hall of Fame alumni

 Hoyt Wilhelm (1973, MGR) Inducted, 1985

Notable alumni
 Jose Alvarez
 Scott Bailes (1982)
 Dusty Baker (1968) 2 x MLB All-Star; 3 x MLB Manager of the Year
 Steve Bedrosian (1978) MLB All-Star; 1987 NL Cy Young Award
 Bruce Benedict (1976) 2 x MLB All-Star
 Mike Bielecki (1981)
 Barry Bonnell (1975)
 Brett Butler (1979) MLB All-Star
 Albert Hall
 Glenn Hubbard (1976-1977) MLB All-Star
 Terry Leach (1977)
 Grady Little (1969)
 Larry McWilliams (1974)
 Rick Mahler (1976) 
 Dale Murphy (1975) 7 x MLB All-Star; 2 x NL Most Valuable Player (1982-1983)
 Rowland Office (1971)
 Joe Orsulak (1981)
 Gerald Perry
 Rafael Ramirez (1978) MLB All-Star
 Rick Renteria (181)
 Bip Roberts (1982-1983) MLB All-Star
 Brian Snitker (1978) Current Manager of the Atlanta Braves
 Milt Thompson (1979)
 Earl Williams (1968) 1971 NL rookie of the Year

References

Baseball teams established in 1968
Defunct Western Carolinas League teams
Atlanta Braves minor league affiliates
Professional baseball teams in South Carolina
1968 establishments in South Carolina
1979 disestablishments in South Carolina
Baseball teams disestablished in 1979
Defunct baseball teams in South Carolina